Petr Pála and David Rikl were the defending champions but only Pála competed that year with David Adams.

Adams and Pála lost in the quarterfinals to Sargis Sargsian and Nenad Zimonjić.

Simon Aspelin and Massimo Bertolini won in the final 6–4, 6–7(8–10), 6–3 against Sargsian and Zimonjić.

Seeds

Draw

External links
2003 International Raiffeisen Grand Prix Doubles Draw

Hypo Group Tennis International
2003 ATP Tour